The Papua New Guinea national under-17 football team is the national U-17 team of Papua New Guinea and is controlled by the Papua New Guinea Football Association.

Competition Record

FIFA U-17 World Cup record

OFC U-17 Championship record
The OFC U-17 Championship is a tournament held once every two years to decide the only two qualification spots for the Oceania Football Confederation (OFC) and its representatives at the FIFA U-17 World Cup.

Current technical staff

Current squad
The following players were called up for the 2018 OFC U-16 Championship from 9 to 22 September 2018.

Caps and goals as of 15 September 2018 after the game against New Zealand.

2017 Squad
The following players were called up for the 2017 OFC U-17 Championship from 11 to 24 February 2017.

Caps and goals as of 22 February 2017 after the game against New Zealand.

Fixtures & Results

2018

References

External links
Papua New Guinea Football Federation official website

under-17
Oceanian national under-17 association football teams